Icora FM (Indonsakusa Community Radio) is a South African community radio station based in KwaZulu-Natal.
It was established on 10 December 1997 in King Dinuzulu Township, Eshowe.

Coverage areas 
From St Lucia, down the coast past Richards Bay & Stanger, through to Ballito.
Includes:
Eshowe
Empangeni
Ulundi
Nongoma
Vryheid
Dundee
Glencoe
Madadeni
And touches parts of Utrecht & Newcastle.

Broadcast languages
Zulu

Broadcast time
24/7

Target audience
LSM Groups 1 - 6
Age Group 16 - 49
From grassroots to upper middle class

Programme format
30% Talk
70% Music

Listenership Figures

Location
The station's physical address is:
25 Osborne Rd, Eshowe

References

External links
 Official Website
 Mobile website
 SAARF Website

Community radio stations in South Africa
Mass media in KwaZulu-Natal